Brune Pourcel née Tavernier was a woman who lived in the Comté de Foix in the early fourteenth century, she was made notable by appearing in Emmanuel Le Roy Ladurie's Montaillou.  A bastard daughter of Prades Tavernier she became a servant in the house of the wealthy Clergue family of Montaillou.  She left their employ upon being married but her husband soon died leaving her a poor widow.  She could not even afford her own oven, being forced to use that of her aunt Alazaïs Rives.

References
 Le Roy Ladurie, Emmanuel. Montaillou: The Promised Land of Error. translated by Barbara Bray. New York: G. Braziller, c1978.

14th-century French people
People from Montaillou
14th-century French women